Rodney Bryan Orr (November 6, 1962 – February 14, 1994) was an American stock car racing driver. The 1993 NASCAR Goody's Dash Series champion, he was killed in an accident during practice for the 1994 Daytona 500.

Career
Orr was born in Robbinsville, North Carolina. A graduate of Robbinsville High School, Orr was a resident of Palm Coast, Florida and started his racing career at Volusia County Speedway in the late 1980s. He was the rookie of the year in the NASCAR Goody's Dash Series in 1992, and won the series' 1993 championship.

Death
Originally, Orr and his father Beacher had planned to advance to the second-tier series (currently the Xfinity Series).  However, NASCAR planned a rule change that would make the current V6 engines obsolete by switching to a limited compression (9.5:1) V8 engine in 1995.  As a result, the Orrs purchased a Ford Thunderbird during the 1993-1994 off-season from Robert Yates Racing with an engine built by Ernie Elliott in hopes of competing in selected 1994 Winston Cup Series races. Orr's No. 37 was one of seven cars to exceed 190 miles per hour at one test session that winter. However, before he could run a single race, Orr was killed in practice before the 1994 Daytona 500.

During practice for second round Daytona 500 qualifying on February 14, 1994, Orr was making what was a mock qualifying run when he spun entering turn two. His car lifted up and slammed heavily into the outside retaining wall and catch fence with the roof at over 175 mph. The caution light was found pierced into the roof of the car. Although there were efforts to save him, Orr had instantly died of massive chest and head injuries. The 31-year-old driver was survived by his wife, Crystal, and daughter Ashton. It was later found that a mounting stud, a part that holds the shock absorber to the car, had broken, rendering the car uncontrollable. Orr's death came three days after that of Neil Bonnett on the same track.

These incidents were related to suspension failure caused by using extremely soft shocks and springs.  Drivers complained about shocks and springs at the two fastest circuits, magnified after the 1998 Pepsi 400 held at night because of sparks, leading to NASCAR imposing rule changes mandating specification shocks and springs to solve the problem by 2000.  As of 2022, NASCAR and suspension parts suppler DR1V mandate specification shocks and springs for all Cup Series races.

Photo scandal
In 2001, Orr gained attention again after the death of Dale Earnhardt when his autopsy photos as well as those of Bonnett and pop star Lisa Lopes were displayed on the internet. Earnhardt's widow Teresa testified before Congress to ensure Earnhardt's autopsy photos would not be published in a similar fashion. Orr's father sued the owner of the website which had published the photos of his son, stating a claim for outrageous publication of a public record.

Motorsports career results

NASCAR
(key) (Bold - pole position awarded by qualifying time Italics - pole position earned by points standings or practice time * – most laps led.)

Winston Cup Series

References

External links

1962 births
1994 deaths
ISCARS Dash Touring Series drivers
NASCAR drivers
People from Palm Coast, Florida
People from Robbinsville, North Carolina
Racing drivers from Florida
Racing drivers who died while racing
Sports deaths in Florida